"Every Little Thing" is a debut song co-written and recorded by American country music singer Carly Pearce. After receiving airplay on Sirius XM's The Highway channel, the song was sent to country music radio in February 2017. Pearce wrote the song with Emily Shackelton and busbee, who also produced it.

Content
AXS describes the song as "a rich musical composition, featuring piano, dobro, bass, cello and minor percussion".

Critical reception
Taste of Country reviewed the song favorably, stating that Pearce "recalls some of country music’s most vulnerable female vocalists. The heartbreaking ballad is as raw as the singer’s emotions."

Music video
The music video was directed by Patrick Tracy and premiered on CMT, GAC, and VEVO in March 2017.

Commercial performance
The song was certified Gold by the RIAA on November 14, 2017. and has sold 393,000 copies in the United States as of November 2018.

Charts

Weekly charts

Year-end charts

Certifications

References

2017 songs
2017 debut singles
Big Machine Records singles
Carly Pearce songs
Country ballads
Song recordings produced by busbee
Songs written by busbee
Songs written by Emily Shackelton
Songs written by Carly Pearce